The Division of Wright is an Australian Electoral Division in Queensland.

Geography
Federal electoral division boundaries in Australia are determined at redistributions by a redistribution committee appointed by the Australian Electoral Commission. Redistributions occur for the boundaries of divisions in a particular state, and they occur every seven years, or sooner if a state's representation entitlement changes or when divisions of a state are malapportioned.

History
The seat was first contested at the 2010 election. The division was created under the Australian Electoral Commission's 2009 Redistribution of Queensland. The division of Wright covers 7,577 square kilometres, stretching from the western Gold Coast, through the remnant rural areas between Logan City and the NSW border, and around to include the Lockyer Valley Council area west of Ipswich. As well as covering most of the Gold Coast hinterland, Wright includes Beaudesert, Jimboomba, Boonah, Laidley, Gatton, Hatton Vale and Helidon.

The name of the electorate was chosen to honour the poet Judith Wright. The division has been represented since the 2010 election by Scott Buchholz, a member of the Liberal National Party.

Members

Election results

References

External links
 Division of Wright (Qld) — Australian Electoral Commission

Electoral divisions of Australia
Constituencies established in 2010
2010 establishments in Australia
Federal politics in Queensland